La Independencia is the eleventh album by the Argentine singer Jorge Cafrune, released in 1966.

Track listing
"La Patria no se hizo sola"  
"Adios general Belgrano"
"Quemandose de su fuego"
"Cuatro barquitos"
"Soldado desconocido"
"La Martin Guemes"
"Cielito de granaderos"
"Le hablo de un nueve de julio"
"Niña de Tucuman"

References

1966 albums
Jorge Cafrune albums
Spanish-language albums
CBS Records albums